

Johannes-Matthias Hönscheid (14 July 1922 – 2 March 2001) was a member of a propaganda company and officer in the Fallschirmjäger forces of Nazi Germany during World War II. He was a recipient of the Knight's Cross of the Iron Cross.

He was nominated and awarded the Knight's Cross of the Iron Cross for his actions in Italy in the final days of the war. His last assignment at the end of the war was with the Flensburg Government (Dönitz Government) as a correspondent and spokesman in Plön and Flensburg. After the war, Hönscheid worked in publishing.

Awards and decorations

 German Cross in Gold (16 March 1945)
 Knight's Cross of the Iron Cross on 16 March 1945 as Oberfeldwebel and as Kriegsberichter der Fallschirmtruppe.

References

Citations

Bibliography

 
 

1922 births
2001 deaths
People from Rhein-Sieg-Kreis
People from the Rhine Province
Fallschirmjäger of World War II
War correspondents of World War II
German prisoners of war in World War II held by the United Kingdom
Recipients of the Gold German Cross
Recipients of the Knight's Cross of the Iron Cross
Military personnel from North Rhine-Westphalia